Skyros, in some historical contexts Latinized Scyros, is an island in Greece, the southernmost of the Sporades, an archipelago in the Aegean Sea. Around the 2nd millennium BC and slightly later, the island was known as The Island of the Magnetes where the Magnetes used to live and later Pelasgia and Dolopia and later Skyros. At  it is the largest island of the Sporades, and has a population of about 3,000 (in 2011). It is part of the regional unit of Euboea.

Municipality
The municipality Skyros is part of the regional unit of Euboea. Apart from the island Skyros, it consists of the small uninhabited island of Skyropoula and a few smaller uninhabited islands.

Geography
The north of the island is covered by a forest, while the south, dominated by the highest mountain, called Kochila, (792 m), is bare and rocky. The island's capital is also called Skyros (or, locally, Chora). The main port, on the west coast, is Linaria. The island has a castle (the kastro) that dates from the Venetian occupation (13th to 15th centuries), a Byzantine monastery (the Monastery of Saint George), the grave of English poet Rupert Brooke in an olive grove by the road leading to Tris Boukes harbour. There are many beaches on the coast. The island has its own breed of Skyrian ponies.

Climate
Skyros has a Mediterranean climate with mild winters and pleasant summers.

Etymology
One account associates the name Skyros with skyron or skiron, meaning "stone debris". The island had a reputation for its decorative stone.

History

According to Greek mythology, Theseus died on Skyros when the local king, Lycomedes, threw him from a cliff. The island is also famous in the myths as the place from where Achilles set sail for Troy after Odysseus discovered him in the court of Lycomedes. Neoptolemus, son of Achilles, was from Skyros (or Scyros, as its name is sometimes transliterated), as told in Book Nineteen of the Iliad (lines 326-327) and in the play by Sophocles, Philoctetes (line 239). A small bay named Achili on the east coast of the island is said to be the place from where Achilles left with the Greeks, or rather where Achilles landed during a squall that befell the Greek fleet following an abortive initial expedition landing astray in Mysia.

In  475 BC, according to Thucydides (1.98), Cimon defeated the Dolopians (the original inhabitants) and conquered the entire island. From that date, Athenian settlers colonized it and it became a part of the Athenian Empire. The island lay on the strategic trade route between Attica and the Black Sea (Athens depended on supplies of grain reaching it through the Hellespont). Cimon claimed to have found the remains of Theseus, and returned them to Athens.

In 340 BC, the Macedonians took over the island and dominated it until 192 BC, when King Philip V of Macedon and the Roman Republican forces restored it to Athens.

After the Fourth Crusade of 1202–1204, the island became part of the domain of Geremia Ghisi. The Byzantines retook it in 1277. After the Fall of Constantinople, Venetians ruled again the island until 1538, when it passed to the Ottoman Empire.

It became part of the new Greek state in 1830.

In 1848, Captain Thomas Graves commanding  surveyed Skyros for the British Admiralty. He travelled around the island, and a record of his observations was published the following year.

Rupert Brooke, the famous English poet, is buried on Skyros, having died on board a French hospital-ship moored off the island on 23 April 1915, during World War I. Present at Brooke's burial that same evening, were Patrick Shaw-Stewart and William Denis Browne. The tomb that visitors see today when they visit the grave, which is located in the Tris Boukes Bay, is one that was commissioned by Brooke’s mother and was placed after the 1st World War. On the tomb is an inscription of Brooke's famous poem The Soldier.

In 1941 Pulitzer Prize-winning poet Karl Shapiro wrote the World War II poem Scyros, which he set on the island Skyros "because it was a tribute to and irony upon Rupert Brooke."

In 1963 the Archaeological Museum of Skyros was established, with the inauguration taking place 10 years later in 1973. The Faltaits Folklore Museum was founded in 1964 - one of the first local folklore museums to operate in Greece.

Spanish flu
In 1918, during the spanish flu, approximately one third of the island's population died in less than 30 days. Specifically, the influenza began on 27 October 1918, and of the 3,200 inhabitants on the island, almost 2,000 were infected and 1,000 died.  described the diring consequences of the pandemic in a rare chronicle published in 1919, titled  .

Historical population

Transportation

Air travel
Skyros is home to the Skyros Island National Airport, a one-runway airport.

Sea travel
Skyros Shipping Company operates the ferry service to Skyros. During holiday season the ferry runs twice daily from Kymi to Linaria on Skyros. During the winter months the service operates daily. The ship has the name "Achilleas SKYROS SHIPPING CO." (Greek: Αχιλλέας ΣΚΥΡΟΣ ΝΑΥΤΙΚΗ ΕΤΑΙΡΙΑ).

Gallery

References

Sporades at the official website of the Greek National Tourism Organisation
The official website of the Skyros Shipping Company

External links

 
Islands of Central Greece
Islands of Greece
Landforms of Euboea (regional unit)
Locations in Greek mythology
Locations in the Iliad
Mediterranean port cities and towns in Greece
Municipalities of Central Greece
Populated places in Euboea (regional unit)
Populated places in the ancient Aegean islands
Sporades
Territories of the Republic of Venice